The Institute of the Mother of Good Counsel (IMBC) is a sedeprivationist traditionalist Catholic religious congregation based in Italy.

Adhering to the Thesis of Cassiciacum of the French theologian Bishop Michel-Louis Guérard des Lauriers, the institute teaches that while Pope Francis is a duly elected pope, unless he recants the doctrinal changes brought by the Second Vatican Council, he lacks the authority to either teach or govern, and is only pope materialiter sed non formaliter, that is "materially but not formally.

History

The Institute of the Mother of Good Counsel was formed in December 1985, when four Italian priests left the Society of Saint Pius X (SSPX). These priests were Father Francesco Ricossa, Father Franco Munari, Father Curzio Nitoglia, and Father Giuseppe Murro. These priests were dissatisfied with the position the SSPX, which acknowledged John Paul II as a true pope but disobeyed him.

The IMBC was first based in Nichelino, Province of Turin, Italy, then later in Verrua Savoia, Province of Turin (currently the Metropolitan City of Turin), Italy.

In September 1986, two priests of the institute traveled to Raveau, France, for the IMBC, to meet the French sedeprivationist Bishop Michel-Louis Guérard des Lauriers, whose Thesis of Cassiciacum the IMBC adopted.

In May 1987, the founders of institute wrote a retraction of doctrines they professed in the past when they still belonged to the SSPX.

Bishops

The IMBC was formerly assisted by Bishop Robert McKenna, an American sedeprivationist bishop, and Bishop Franco Munari, one of the four founders of the institute, who later left it. Both of these bishops were consecrated by des Lauriers in 1986 and 1987, respectively.

On 16 January 2002, McKenna consecrated to the episcopacy Father Geert Jan Stuyver, a Belgian priest and member of the IMBC, who administers to the needs of the institute at present.

Present day

The IMBC operates in Western Europe, Hungary, and Argentina. The institute is strongest in Italy, France, and Belgium. It operates the seminary of San Pietro martire in Verrua Savoia.

In regards to the rubrics of the Mass, the liturgical calendar, and the Divine Office, the IMBC uses earlier editions which had been promulgated by Pope Pius X.

The institute periodically carries out the Spiritual Exercises of Ignatius of Loyola, holds various conferences, organizes pilgrimages, and periodically publishes the Sodalitium magazine.

The IMBC also uses the name Sodalitium Pianum as an alternative name; this was the name of an unofficial group of theologians and others set up in the early twentieth century by Umberto Benigni to report to him those thought to be teaching Modernist doctrines.

References

External links
 English Website of the Institute

Sedeprivationists
Communities using the Tridentine Mass